This is a list of sporting events held in Thailand.

Multi-sport event

International sports federations events 
Summer Olympics Federations

Thailand